Compton Halt was a small single platform halt on the Wombourne Branch Line. It was opened by the Great Western Railway in 1925 and closed in 1932. Poor patronage was a factor in the closure of the line and Compton Halt's existence was similarly blighted.

Only the platform remains but is heavily overgrown and is partly decayed. The halt is now part of the South Staffordshire Railway Walk.

References
Rail Around Birmingham and the West Midlands: Compton Halt railway station

Further reading

Disused railway stations in Wolverhampton
Former Great Western Railway stations
Railway stations in Great Britain opened in 1925
Railway stations in Great Britain closed in 1932